The Plaza at Harmon Meadow is a shopping complex in  the Meadowlands of Secaucus, New Jersey, approximately six miles from New York City. It was developed by Hartz Mountain Industries, whose corporate offices are located in the Plaza. It was purchased by Howard Michaels's Carlton Group in 2015. It was built in 1981.

In addition to its offices, The Plaza at Harmon Meadow has a convention center, a 14-screen Kerasotes Theatres complex, the Meadowlands Exposition Center, The Mall at Mill Creek, and its own post office.

The Plaza at Harmon Meadow is bound on the south by Route 3 and Paterson Plank Road. The mall is accessible via the bus lines 78 from Newark, 85 from New Jersey (Jersey City and Union City), and the 190 and 320 interstate bus lines, which travel to and from the Port Authority Bus Terminal in Midtown Manhattan.

From June 30 to July 1, 2012, it was host to BronyCon, a fan based convention for the television program My Little Pony: Friendship is Magic.

In 2015, the Meadowlands Exposition Center, which is located in the Plaza, became the hosting location for the East Coast Comicon, having moved there from Asbury Park.

Notes

External links
The Plaza at Harmon Meadow and The Mall at Mill Creek at Hartz Mountain Industries
International Council of Shopping Centers: Harmon Meadows

Secaucus, New Jersey
Shopping malls in New Jersey
Buildings and structures in Hudson County, New Jersey
Tourist attractions in Hudson County, New Jersey
Shopping malls in the New York metropolitan area
Shopping malls established in 1981